The Institute of Medical Sciences may refer to one of several organisations:

India 
 Nizam's Institute of Medical Sciences, a university in Hyderabad, Telangana, India
 MediCiti Institute of Medical Sciences, a medical college, affiliated with the NTR University of Health Sciences in India
 Kalinga Institute of Medical Sciences, the health wing of the KIIT Group of Institutions situated in Bhubaneswar, Orissa, India
 The All India Institute of Medical Sciences, a medical college and hospital in New Delhi, India
 Amala Institute of Medical Sciences, a private medical college near Amalanagar, in Thrissur  District, Kerala, India
 Malabar Institute of Medical Sciences, a hospital located in Kozhikode, India.
 Pondicherry Institute of Medical Sciences, a private educational institute located in Pondicherry, India
 Guntur Institute of Medical Sciences, a Medical Colleges in Guntur, India
 Rajendra Institute of Medical Sciences, an institute at Ranchi University, India
 Karnataka Institute of Medical Sciences, in Karanata, India.  Previously the Karnataka Medical College (KMC)
 Vijayanagara Institute of Medical Sciences, in Karanata, India. Previously the Bellary Medical College
 N. S. Memorial Institute of Medical Sciences, in Kollam, India
 Regional Institute of Medical Sciences of Manipur, India
 The Institute of Medical Sciences of the Banaras Hindu University in Varanasi, India
 The A J Institute of Medical Science, a medical college in Mangalore, India
 Rajendra Memorial Research Institute of Medical Sciences, Agam Kuan, Patna, Bihar, India
 Rural Institute of Medical Sciences and Research, a Medical College located in Saifai, District Etawah, Uttar Pradesh, India
 P.E.S. Institute of Medical Sciences and Research, a medical college in the town of Kuppam, Andhra Pradesh, India
 Sikkim Manipal Institute of Medical Sciences, an Indian  medical college located in Sikkim
 Mahatma Gandhi Institute of Medical Sciences, run by the Kasturba Health Society
 Indira Gandhi Institute of Medical Sciences
 Sree Chitra Thirunal Institute of Medical Sciences and Technology, Thiruvananthapuram (Trivandrum), India
 Vydehi Institute of Medical Sciences and Research Centre, at Whitefield, Bangalore, India
 Sanjay Gandhi Post Graduate Institute of Medical Sciences, Lucknow, Uttar Pradesh
 Maharashtra Institute of Medical Science and Research, Latur, a Medical Institution located in Latur, Maharashtra, India
 Khaja Banda Nawaz institute of medical sciences, affiliated to Rajiv Gandhi University of Health Sciences, Bangalore
 Kempegowda Institute of Medical Sciences (KIMS) in Bangalore, India
 Rajarajeswari Medical College and Hospital (RRMCH) in Bangalore Karnataka, India
 Telangana Institute of Medical Sciences and Research (TIMS) in Hyderabad, Telangana, India

Japan
 The Institute of Medical Science (Japan), an ancillary establishment of The University of Tokyo
 Nihon Institute of Medical Science, a private university in Moroyama, Saitama, Japan

Pakistan
 The Pakistan Institute of Medical Sciences in Islamabad
 Services Institute of Medical Sciences, a public medical school, attached to Services Hospital, and located in Lahore, Punjab, Pakistan
 Kust Institute of Medical Sciences of Kohat University of Science and Technology (KUST), Pakistan

United Kingdom
 The Institute of Medical Sciences of the University of Aberdeen

United States
 National Institute of General Medical Sciences